Sancia di Castiglia is an Italian opera seria in two acts by Gaetano Donizetti to a libretto by Pietro Salatino. It was first performed at the Teatro San Carlo in Naples on 4 November 1832, conducted by Nicola Festa.

Roles

Synopsis
Place: Castile, Spain
Time: The Middle Ages

Sancia, Queen of Castile, whose husband has been killed in battle, also believes that her son, Garcia, has been killed. She plans to marry the Saracen prince, Ircano, against the advice of her minister, Rodrigo. When Garcia, having survived an assassination attempt instigated by Ircano, reappears to claim the throne, Ircano tells Sancia that he will marry her only if she poisons her son. Garcia is about to drink from the poisoned goblet when a suddenly repentant Sancia snatches it and drinks it herself. She dies pleading for her son's forgiveness.

Recordings

Notes and references

Further reading
Allitt, John Stewart (1991), Donizetti: In the Light of Romanticism and the Teaching of Johann Simon Mayr, Shaftesbury: Element Books, Ltd (UK); Rockport, Massachusetts: Element, Inc. (USA)
Ashbrook, William (1982), Donizetti and His Operas, Cambridge University Press. 
Ashbrook, William (1998), "Donizetti, Gaetano" in Stanley Sadie (ed.), The New Grove Dictionary of Opera, vol. 1. London: Macmillan  
Ashbrook, William and Sarah Hibberd (2001), in Holden, Amanda (ed.), The New Penguin Opera Guide, New York: Penguin Putnam. . pp. 224–247.
Black, John (1982), Donizetti’s Operas in Naples, 1822—1848. London: The Donizetti Society.
Loewenberg, Alfred (1970). Annals of Opera, 1597-1940, 2nd edition. Rowman and Littlefield
Osborne, Charles, (1994), The Bel Canto Operas of Rossini, Donizetti, and Bellini, Portland, Oregon: Amadeus Press. 
Sadie, Stanley, (ed.); John Tyrell (exec. ed.) (2004), The New Grove Dictionary of Music and Musicians. 2nd edition. London: Macmillan.  (hardcover).   (eBook).
 Weinstock, Herbert (1963), Donizetti and the World of Opera in Italy, Paris, and Vienna in the First Half of the Nineteenth Century, New York: Pantheon Books.

External links
 
 Donizetti Society (London) website

Italian-language operas
Operas by Gaetano Donizetti
Opera seria
1832 operas
Operas
Opera world premieres at the Teatro San Carlo
Operas set in Spain